This page covers the record of the Republic of Ireland national football team in the FIFA World Cup, European Football Championship and UEFA Nations League. In the "Results" section, home results are written before away results. Where the Republic of Ireland only played a team once, (h), (a) and (n) indicate home, away or neutral respectively.

Results

Qualification (including UEFA Nations League)

Finals tournaments

Summer Olympics 1924, Paris

Summer Olympics 1948, London

Euro 1988

World Cup Italia 90

World Cup USA 94

World Cup Korea-Japan 2002

Euro 2012

Euro 2016

UEFA countries the Republic of Ireland have never played competitively

  (have played in a friendly)
  (have played in friendlies; will play in Euro 2024 qualifiers)

See also
Republic of Ireland at the FIFA World Cup
Republic of Ireland at the UEFA European Championship

References